Secular laws regulating hairstyles exist in various countries and institutions.

Present laws

India

In the Armed, Paramilitary and Law enforcement forces of India, male Sikh servicemen are allowed to wear full beards as their religion expressly requires followers to do so. However, they are specifically required to "dress up their hair and beard properly". In December 2003, the Supreme Court of India ruled that Muslims in uniform can grow beards.

Non-Muslims and non-Sikhs serving in the Indian Army or the Indian Air Force are not permitted to wear beards. However, Army personnel on active duty are sometimes exempt from facial hair regulations for the duration of their tour of duty if their deployment makes it difficult to shave. Indian Navy personnel are allowed to grow beards subject to the permission of their commanding officer. Exceptions for other religions are made in the case of special forces operatives like the Indian Air Force Pilots, Indian army's Para (Special Forces) soldiers and the navy's MARCOS commandos who are allowed to grow beards. Non-Sikh personnel are allowed to grow whiskers and moustaches, with the only regulation being that "will be of moderate length".

Iran 
In a stated attempt to preserve the culture of the country and combat cultural imperialism, the government of Iran has banned "Western hair styles" for men, including ponytails, mullets and spikes.

North Korea 

Radio Free Asia reported in 2014 that the North Korean government had a recommended list of 18 hair styles for women and 10 hair styles for men, and that some colleges had recommended male students model their hair after Kim Jong-un. However, Dr. Katharine H.S. Moon, Wasserman Chair of Asian Studies at Wellesley College, refutes these claims, stating that, "There's no evidence that their hairstyles must follow totalitarian regulation," and that she had personally witnessed a wide variety of hair styles, including hair dye, while visiting Pyongyang in 2013.

Tajikistan 
Beards are discouraged by the government for most men in Tajikistan in a stated effort to battle radicalism. Only clean-shaven men can apply for a passport. Beards are often forcibly shaved off by police officers.

Thailand
Male Thai police and military personnel, are required to wear a hairstyle known as the "904 cut". The style means shaving the sides and back of the head, leaving just a suggestion of hair on top. The corresponding hairstyle for female police officers and female soldiers, in case of long hair (shoulders level), must keep their hair in bun with properly color of ribbon and net (black, dark brown or navy blue).
 
School dress codes in Thailand have long mandated earlobe-length bobs for girls and army-style crew cuts for boys. It is not uncommon for teachers to cut the hair of students deemed to be in violation of the frequently arbitrary code.

Past laws

Albania 
No man could enter the country whilst wearing one of the banned hair styles.

British North America
Long hair for men was illegal in the Massachusetts Bay Colony starting in 1634.

China
The Han Chinese first Ming dynasty emperor Zhu Yuanzhang passed a law on mandatory hairstyle on 24 September 1392, mandating that all males grow their hair long and making it illegal for them to shave part of their foreheads while leaving strands of hair which was the Mongol hairstyle. The penalty for both the barber and the person who was shaved and his sons was castration if they cut their hair and their families were to be sent to the borders for exile. This helped eradicate the partially shaved Mongol hairstyles and enforced long Han hairstyle.

In Qing dynasty China, all male subjects of all ethnicities were required to wear their hair in a long braid and to shave the front of their scalp. Those who resisted were subject to execution for treason. All Chinese men stopped sporting the Queue braid tonsure hairstyle, in favor of short western hairstyles, following the collapse the Qing Dynasty in the 1910s which was succeeded by the Republic of Mainland China.

Czechoslovakia 

Following the Prague Spring of 1968, Western 1960s counterculture inspired the Mánička subculture amongst Czechoslovak youth. The long hairstyles associated with this was discouraged and suppressed by the authorities, who saw it as a subversive Western cultural influence.

Japan 

In the Edo period (1603–1867) of Japan, the Tokugawa Shogunate passed orders for Japanese men to shave the pate on the front of their head (the  hairstyle) and shave their beards, facial hair and side whiskers. This was similar to the Qing dynasty queue order imposed by Dorgon making men shave the pates on the front of their heads. During the fourth year of the Meiji period in 1871, Emperor Meiji issued the  Edict which abolished the chonmage hairstyle. As a result of the decree which was issued as part of the Meiji Restoration, all Japanese men were forced to chop off their topknots and switch to short Western hairstyles in addition to switching to Western clothing. The  was abandoned along with the samurai class in the 1870s, as a result of the Meiji Restoration and modernization of Japan. However, this decree/edict abolishing the  hairstyle did not apply to sumo wrestlers as they are permitted to continue sporting  into the modern era.

Russia 

As part of his drive to modernise and Westernise Tsarist Russia, Peter the Great imposed a beard tax in 1698 to encourage Russian men to shave off their beards. Men who kept their beards but refused to pay the tax were forcibly shaven.

Singapore 

There was a national ban of long hair for men in Singapore; the reason was the growth of hippie subculture worldwide. The law has since changed and nowadays, men can display any kind of hairstyle.

South Korea 
In 1973, South Korea under Park Chung-hee introduced the Minor Offenses Act which limited the length of hair for males and mandated a minimum length of skirts for females. There are no specific definitions of acceptable hair length, and violators were often taken to police stations and had their hair cut against their will.

Vietnam 

The Han Chinese referred to the various non-Han "barbarian" peoples of north Vietnam and southern China as "Yue" (Viet) or Baiyue, saying they possessed common habits like adapting to water, having their hair cropped short and tattooed. The Han also said their language was "animal shrieking" and that they lacked morals, modesty, civilization and culture.

When Han Chinese ruled the Vietnamese in the Fourth Chinese domination of Vietnam due to the Ming dynasty's conquest during the Ming–Hồ War they imposed the Han Chinese style of men wearing long hair on short-haired Vietnamese men. Vietnamese were ordered to stop cutting and instead grow their hair long and switch to Han Chinese clothing in only a month by a Ming official. Ming administrators said their mission was to civilize the unorthodox Vietnamese barbarians. A royal edict was issued by Vietnam in 1474 forbidding Vietnamese from adopting foreign languages, hairstyles and clothes like that of the Lao, Champa or the Ming "Northerners". The edict was recorded in the 1479 Complete Chronicle of Dai Viet of Ngô Sĩ Liên in the Later Lê dynasty.

See also

Hair related
 Beard oil
 Discrimination based on hair texture
 Facial hair in the military
 List of facial hairstyles
 List of hairstyles
 Moustache styles
 Pigtail Ordinance

General
Dress code
Clothing laws by country
Hijab by country
Emo killings in Iraq

References 

Anti-imperialism
Beard
Gender roles
Hairstyles
Nationalism